The 1993 Czech Republic motorcycle Grand Prix was the eleventh round of the 1993 Grand Prix motorcycle racing season. It took place on 22 August 1993 at the Masaryk Circuit located in Brno, Czech Republic.

500 cc race report
John Kocinski is given a Cagiva to ride after impressing them during testing.

Kevin Schwantz needs to do well, and very disappointingly, qualifies in the 2nd row. Kenny Roberts looks happy that Rainey qualifies in 1st, his first pole since 1991. Kocinski gives Cagiva one of their best qualifyings with 3rd on the grid.

Kocinski jump-starts but stops it immediately before the green light. Luca Cadalora gets the start from Rainey, Kocinski and Mick Doohan.

Rainey takes the front from Cadalora, Doohan, Kocinski, Shinichi Itoh and Daryl Beattie.

Team Roberts has found a good setting, because Rainey and Cadalora immediately open a gap.

Niall Mackenzie lowsides out.

Schwantz is struggling around 5th. He later admits that he tore some muscles in his shoulder in the Donington crash, and that it interfered with his riding.

Team orders don’t need to be remembered, because Rainey has disappeared into the distance. With 3 rounds left, Rainey has an 11-point lead on Schwantz.

500 cc classification

250 cc classification

References

Czech Republic motorcycle Grand Prix
Czech Republic
Motorcycle Grand Prix